Cynorkis is a genus of flowering plants from the orchid family, Orchidaceae. It is native to tropical and southern Africa, as well as several islands in the Indian Ocean.

Species 

 Cynorkis alborubra
 Cynorkis ambondrombensis
 Cynorkis ampullacea
 Cynorkis ampullifera
 Cynorkis anacamptoides
 Cynorkis andohahelensis
 Cynorkis andringitrana
 Cynorkis angustipetala
 Cynorkis anisoloba
 Cynorkis aphylla
 Cynorkis arnottioides
 Cynorkis aurantiaca
 Cynorkis bardotiana
 Cynorkis baronii
 Cynorkis bathiei
 Cynorkis betsileensis
 Cynorkis bimaculata
 Cynorkis boinana
 Cynorkis brachycentra
 Cynorkis brachyceras
 Cynorkis brachystachya
 Cynorkis brevicalcar
 Cynorkis brevicornu
 Cynorkis breviplectra
 Cynorkis buchananii
 Cynorkis buchwaldiana
 Cynorkis cadetii
 Cynorkis calanthoides
 Cynorkis calcaripotens
 Cynorkis cardiophylla
 Cynorkis catatii
 Cynorkis clarae
 Cynorkis clavata
 Cynorkis coccinelloides
 Cynorkis commersoniana
 Cynorkis commersonii
 Cynorkis comorensis
 Cynorkis compacta
 Cynorkis confusa
 Cynorkis constellata
 Cynorkis cordemoyi
 Cynorkis crispa
 Cynorkis cuneilabia
 Cynorkis cylindrostachys
 Cynorkis debilis
 Cynorkis decaryana
 Cynorkis discolor
 Cynorkis disperidoides
 Cynorkis elata
 Cynorkis elegans
 Cynorkis ericophila
 Cynorkis exilis
 Cynorkis falcata
 Cynorkis fastigiata
 Cynorkis filiformis
 Cynorkis fimbriata
 Cynorkis flabellifera
 Cynorkis flexuosa
 Cynorkis formosa
 Cynorkis frappieri
 Cynorkis gabonensis
 Cynorkis gaesiformis
 Cynorkis galeata
 Cynorkis gibbosa
 Cynorkis gigas
 Cynorkis glandulosa
 Cynorkis globifera
 Cynorkis globosa
 Cynorkis globulosa
 Cynorkis graminea
 Cynorkis guttata
 Cynorkis gymnochiloides
 Cynorkis henrici
 Cynorkis hispidula
 Cynorkis hologlossa
 Cynorkis humbertii
 Cynorkis humblotiana
 Cynorkis jumelleana
 Cynorkis kaessneriana
 Cynorkis kassneriana
 Cynorkis kirkii
 Cynorkis kiehnii (from Madagascar)
 Cynorkis laeta
 Cynorkis lancilabia
 Cynorkis latipetala
 Cynorkis laxiflora
 Cynorkis lilacina
 Cynorkis lindleyana
 Cynorkis lowiana
 Cynorkis ludens
 Cynorkis marianneae Hermans (from Madagascar)
 Cynorkis marmorata Hermans (from Madagascar)
 Cynorkis marojejyensis
 Cynorkis melinantha
 Cynorkis mellitula
 Cynorkis micrantha
 Cynorkis minuticalcar
 Cynorkis monadenia
 Cynorkis muscicola
 Cynorkis murex Hermans (from Madagascar)
 Cynorkis nervilabris
 Cynorkis nitida
 Cynorkis nutans
 Cynorkis ochroglossa
 Cynorkis ochyrae
 Cynorkis orchioides
 Cynorkis papilio
 Cynorkis papillosa
 Cynorkis paradoxa
 Cynorkis parviflora
 Cynorkis parvula
 Cynorkis pelicanides
 Cynorkis perrieri
 Cynorkis petiolata
 Cynorkis peyrotii
 Cynorkis pinguicularioides
 Cynorkis pleiadea
 Cynorkis pleistadenia
 Cynorkis pseudorolfei
 Cynorkis purpurascens
 Cynorkis purpurea
 Cynorkis quinqueloba
 Cynorkis quinquepartita
 Cynorkis raymondiana
 Cynorkis reticulata
 Cynorkis rhomboglossa
 Cynorkis ridleyi
 Cynorkis ringens
 Cynorkis rolfei
 Cynorkis rosellata
 Cynorkis rungweensis
 Cynorkis sacculata
 Cynorkis sagittata
 Cynorkis sambiranoensis
 Cynorkis saxicola
 Cynorkis schlechteri
 Cynorkis schmidtii
 Cynorkis seychellarum
 Cynorkis sigmoidea
 Cynorkis sororia
 Cynorkis souegesii
 Cynorkis spatulata
 Cynorkis squamosa
 Cynorkis stenoglossa
 Cynorkis stolonifera
 Cynorkis subtilis
 Cynorkis summerhayesiana
 Cynorkis sylvatica
 Cynorkis symoensii
 Cynorkis tamponensis
 Cynorkis tenella
 Cynorkis tenerrima
 Cynorkis tenuicalcar
 Cynorkis trilinguis
 Cynorkis tristis
 Cynorkis tryphioides
 Cynorkis uncata
 Cynorkis uniflora
 Cynorkis usambarae
 Cynorkis variegata
 Cynorkis verrucosa
 Cynorkis villosa
 Cynorkis violacea
 Cynorkis zaratananae

See also 
 List of Orchidaceae genera

References 

 Pridgeon, A.M., Cribb, P.J., Chase, M.A. & Rasmussen, F. eds. (1999). Genera Orchidacearum 1. Oxford Univ. Press.
 Pridgeon, A.M., Cribb, P.J., Chase, M.A. & Rasmussen, F. eds. (2001). Genera Orchidacearum 2. Oxford Univ. Press.
 Pridgeon, A.M., Cribb, P.J., Chase, M.A. & Rasmussen, F. eds. (2003). Genera Orchidacearum 3. Oxford Univ. Press
 Berg Pana, H. 2005. Handbuch der Orchideen-Namen. Dictionary of Orchid Names. Dizionario dei nomi delle orchidee. Ulmer, Stuttgart

External links 

Orchideae genera
Orchideae